Ahmed Kamar (born 19 September 1986) is an Egyptian sports shooter. He competed in the men's trap event at the 2016 Summer Olympics.

References

External links
 
 

1986 births
Living people
Egyptian male sport shooters
Olympic shooters of Egypt
Shooters at the 2016 Summer Olympics
Sportspeople from Giza
Mediterranean Games silver medalists for Egypt
Mediterranean Games medalists in shooting
Competitors at the 2018 Mediterranean Games
African Games gold medalists for Egypt
Competitors at the 2019 African Games
African Games medalists in shooting
21st-century Egyptian people